Through Chasm, Caves and Titan Woods is an EP by Norwegian black metal band Carpathian Forest. Released in 1995, through Avantgarde Music, this is Carpathian Forest's first studio release. The title is taken from an Edgar Allan Poe poem, "Dream-Land".

The record was particularly popular with Norwegian fans upon its release.

Background
The song "The Eclipse/The Raven" consists entirely of lines from Edgar Allan Poe's famous poem "The Raven".

Track listing

Credits
 R. Nattefrost – vocals, guitar, keyboards
 J. Nordavind – backing vocals, guitar, keyboards

References

Carpathian Forest albums
1995 EPs
Avantgarde Music EPs